Gobiomyidae is a small extinct family of rodents from the Eocene of Asia. The family contains four genera (one remains unnamed) and belongs to the superfamily Ctenodactyloidea (Wang, 2001), which also contains the living Laotian rock rat and gundis and their fossil relatives (families Diatomyidae and Ctenodactylidae, respectively). When Wang named the family, gobiomyids were considered the closest known relatives of Ctenodactylidae, but newer research indicates that Diatomyidae is more closely related to living ctenodactylids (Dawson et al., 2006).

References

  2006. Laonastes and the "Lazarus effect" in Recent mammals. Science, 311:1456-1458.
  2001. Eocene ctenodactyloids (Rodentia, Mammalia) from Nei Mongol, China. Vertebrata PalAsiatica, 39(2):98-114.

Prehistoric rodent families
Eocene first appearances
Eocene extinctions